The Lithuanian International  is an international badminton tournament held in Lithuania. This tournament has been a Future Series. The 2011 tournament was called Lithuanian Open, and classified as International Series level. It is organised by Lithuanian Badminton Federation.

Previous winners

Performances by nation

References 

Badminton tournaments
Sports competitions in Lithuania
Badminton tournaments in Lithuania